Garfield Avenue is a station on the Hudson–Bergen Light Rail (HBLR) in the Claremont section of Jersey City, Hudson County, New Jersey. Located between the grade crossing at Randolph Avenue and the bridge at Garfield Avenue, the station in a double side platform and two track structure. The station is on the West Side Avenue branch of the Hudson–Bergen Light Rail, which goes from West Side Avenue station to Tonnelle Avenue station in North Bergen. The station is accessible for handicapped people as per the Americans with Disabilities Act of 1990. An elevator is present to get people from Garfield Avenue to track level and the platforms are even with the train cars. The station opened to the public on April 15, 2000 as part of the original operating segment of the Hudson–Bergen Light Rail.

Garfield Avenue station is a block east of the former Arlington Avenue stop of the Newark and New York Railroad, a branch of the Central Railroad of New Jersey. This branch went from the Lafayette Street Terminal in Newark to the junction at Communipaw station in Jersey City, where it met up with the main line to Communipaw Terminal. Service on the line began on July 23, 1869. The station depot westbound at Arlington Avenue was built in 1889 and the eastbound station in 1910. Service to Newark ended abruptly on February 3, 1946 when a steamship knocked two spans of the bridge over the Hackensack River into the water below. Passenger service at Arlington Avenue ended on May 6, 1948.

History
The station opened on April 15, 2000.

In early 2019, it was announced that the West Side Avenue, Martin Luther King Drive, and Garfield Avenue stations on the West Side Branch would close for nine months starting in June 2019 for repairs to a sewer line running along he right-of-way. During that time, replacement service would be provided by NJ Transit shuttle buses.

Station layout

The station is at the eastern end of a railroad cut originally excavated in Bergen Hill in 1869 for the Central Railroad of New Jersey Newark and New York Railroad Branch. Garfield Avenue, presumably named for assassinated president James A. Garfield, was once part of Bergen Point Plank Road, which itself had once been a major colonial post road. A decorative theme for the station is two dimensional "cut-outs" of adults and children, some of whom are playing.

Gallery

Bibliography

References

External links

 Garfield Avenue entrance from Google Maps Street View
 Randolph Avenue entrance from Google Maps Street View
 Platforms from Google Maps Street View
 Pedestrian Crossing & Exit to Garfield Avenue from Google Maps Street View

Hudson-Bergen Light Rail stations
Transportation in Jersey City, New Jersey
Railway stations in the United States opened in 2000
Former Central Railroad of New Jersey stations
2000 establishments in New Jersey